Media studies is a discipline and field of study that deals with the content, history, and effects of various media; in particular, the mass media. Media Studies may draw on traditions from both the social sciences and the humanities, but mostly from its core disciplines of mass communication, communication, communication sciences, and communication studies.

Researchers may also develop and employ theories and methods from disciplines including cultural studies, rhetoric (including digital rhetoric), philosophy, literary theory, psychology, political science, political economy, economics, sociology, anthropology, social theory, art history and criticism, film theory, and information theory.

Origin 

Former priest and American educator, John Culkin, was one of the earliest advocates for the implementation of media studies curriculum in schools. He believed students ought to be capable of scrutinizing mass media, and valued the application of modern communication techniques within the education system. In 1975, Culkin introduced the first media studies M.A. program in the U.S, which has since graduated more than 2,000 students.
Culkin was also responsible for bringing his colleague, and fellow media scholar, Marshall McLuhan to Fordham University, and subsequently founding the Center for Understanding Media, which became the New School program. Both educators are recognized as pioneers in the discipline, credited with paving the way for media studies curriculum within the education system.

Australia 
Media is studied as a broad subject in most states in Australia. Media studies in Australia was first developed as an area of study in Victorian universities in the early 1960s, and in secondary schools in the mid 1960s.

Today, almost all Australian universities teach media studies. According to the Government of Australia's "Excellence in Research for Australia" report, the leading universities in the country for media studies (which were ranked well above World standards by the report's scoring methodology) are Monash University, QUT, RMIT, University of Melbourne, University of Queensland and UTS.

In secondary schools, an early film studies course first began being taught as part of the Victorian junior secondary curriculum during the mid 1960s. And, by the early 1970s, an expanded media studies course was being taught. The course became part of the senior secondary curriculum (later known as the Victorian Certificate of Education or "VCE") in the 1980s. It has since become, and continues to be, a strong component of the VCE. Notable figures in the development of the Victorian secondary school curriculum were the long time Rusden College media teacher Peter Greenaway (not the British film director), Trevor Barr (who authored one of the first media text books Reflections of Reality) and later John Murray (who authored The Box in the Corner, In Focus, and 10 Lessons in Film Appreciation).

Today, Australian states and territories that teach media studies at a secondary level are Australian Capital Territory, Northern Territory, Queensland, South Australia, Victoria and Western Australia. Media studies does not appear to be taught in the state of New South Wales at a secondary level.

In Victoria, the VCE media studies course is structured as: Unit 1 - Representation, Technologies of Representation, and New Media; Unit 2 - Media Production, Australian Media Organisations; Unit 3 - Narrative Texts, Production Planning; and Unit 4 - Media Process, Social Values, and Media Influence. Media studies also form a major part of the primary and junior secondary curriculum, and includes areas such as photography, print media and television.

Victoria also hosts the peak media teaching body known as ATOM which publishes Metro and Screen Education magazines.

Canada 

In Canada, media studies and communication studies are incorporated in the same departments and cover a wide range of approaches (from critical theory to organizations to research-creation and political economy, for example). Over time, research developed to employ theories and methods from cultural studies, philosophy, political economy, gender, sexuality and race theory, management, rhetoric, film theory, sociology, and anthropology. Harold Innis and Marshall McLuhan are famous Canadian scholars for their contributions to the fields of media ecology and political economy in the 20th century. They were both important members of the Toronto School of Communication at the time. More recently, the School of Montreal and its founder James R. Taylor significantly contributed to the field of organizational communication by focusing on the ontological processes of organizations.

Carleton University and the University of Western Ontario, 1945 and 1946 prospectively, created Journalism specific programs or schools. A Journalism specific program was also created at Ryerson in 1950. The first communication programs in Canada were started at Ryerson and Concordia Universities. The Radio and Television Arts program at Ryerson were started in the 1950s, while the Film, Media Studies/Media Arts, and Photography programs also originated from programs started in the 1950s. The Communication studies department at Concordia was created in the late 1960s. Ryerson's Radio and Television, Film, Media and Photography programs were renowned by the mid 1970s, and its programs were being copied by other colleges and universities nationally and Internationally. Western University later followed suit, establishing The Faculty of Information and Media Studies. Carleton later expanded upon its school of journalism, introducing the mass communication and media studies program in 1978.

Today, most universities offer undergraduate degrees in Media and Communication Studies, and many Canadian scholars actively contribute to the field, among which: Brian Massumi (philosophy, cultural studies), Kim Sawchuk (cultural studies, feminist, ageing studies), Carrie Rentschler (feminist theory), and François Cooren (organizational communication).

In his book “Understanding Media, The Extensions of Man”, media theorist Marshall McLuhan suggested that "the medium is the message", and that all human artefacts and technologies are media. His book introduced the usage of terms such as “media” into our language along with other precepts, among them “global village” and “Age of Information”.  A medium is anything that mediates our interaction with the world or other humans. Given this perspective, media study is not restricted to just media of communications but all forms of technology. Media and their users form an ecosystem and the study of this ecosystem is known as media ecology.

McLuhan says that the “technique of fragmentation that is the essence of machine technology” shaped the restructuring of human work and association and “the essence of automation technology is the opposite”.  He uses an example of the electric light to make this connection and to explain “the medium is the message”. The electric light is pure information and it is a medium without a message unless it is used to spell out some verbal ad or a name. The characteristic of all media means the “content” of any medium is always another medium. For example, the content of writing is speech, the written word is the content of print, and print is the content of the telegraph. The change that the medium or technology introduces into human affairs is the “message”. If the electric light is used for Friday night football or to light up your desk you could argue that the content of the electric light is these activities. The fact that it is the medium that shapes and controls the form of human association and action makes it the message.  The electric light is over looked as a communication medium because it doesn't have any content. It is not until the electric light is used to spell a brand name that it is recognized as medium. Similar to radio and other mass media electric light eliminates time and space factors in human association creating deeper involvement. McLuhan compared the “content” to a juicy piece of meat being carried by a burglar to distract the “watchdog of the mind”. The effect of the medium is made strong because it is given another media “content”. The content of a movie is a book, play or maybe even an opera.

McLuhan talks about media being “hot” or “cold” and touches on the principle that distinguishes them from one another. A hot medium (i.e., radio or Movie) extends a single sense in “high definition”. High definition means the state of being well filled with data. A cool medium (i.e., Telephone and TV) is considered “low definition” because a small amount of data/information is given and has to be filled in. Hot media are low in participation and cool media are high in participation. Hot media are low in participation because it is giving most of the information and it excludes. Cool media are high in participation because it gives you information but you have to fill in the blanks and it is inclusive. He used lecturing as an example for hot media and seminars as an example for low media. If you use a hot medium in a hot or cool culture makes a difference.

In his book, “Empire and Communications”, University of Toronto professor, Harold Innis, highlighted media technologies as a powerful contributor to the rise and collapse of empires. Innis’ theory of media bias pulls upon historical evidence to argue that a medium will be biased towards either time or space. He claims that this inherent bias will reveal a medium’s significance to the development of its civilization. Innis identifies media biased towards time as a medium durable in character like clay, stone or parchment. Time biased media are heavy, therefore difficult to relocate, which keeps their message centralized, and thus maintains economic and social control within the hands of a hierarchical authority structure. He defines media in favor of space as a lighter, more transferable medium like papyrus. Opposite to media in favor of time, Innis explains that the transferable quality of media biased towards space permits civilizations to expand more quickly across vast areas, thus benefiting the growth of sectors like trade. Space biased media influences an empire to decentralize its power and widen its reach of influence. Though these biases are in competition with each other, Innis argued that an empire requires the presence of both time and space biased media to succeed as a lasting civilization.

China 

There are two universities in China that specialize in media studies. Communication University of China, formerly known as the Beijing Broadcasting Institute, that dates back to 1954.  CUC has 15,307 full-time students, including 9264 undergraduates, 3512 candidates for doctor and master's degrees and 16,780 students in programs of continuing education. The other university known for media studies in China is Zhejiang University of Media and Communications (ZUMC) which has campuses in Hangzhou and Tongxiang. Almost 10,000 full-time students are currently studying in over 50 programs at the 13 Colleges and Schools of ZUMC. Both institutions have produced some of China's brightest broadcasting talents for television as well as leading journalists at magazines and newspapers.

Czech Republic

There is no university specialized on journalism and media studies, but there are seven public universities which have a department of media studies. Three biggest are based in Prague (Charles University),  Brno (Masaryk University) and Olomouc (Palacký University). There are another nine private universities and colleges which has media studies department.

France 
One prominent French media critic is the sociologist Pierre Bourdieu who wrote among other books On Television (New Press, 1999). Bourdieu's analysis is that television provides far less autonomy, or freedom, than we think. In his view, the market (which implies the hunt for higher advertising revenue) not only imposes uniformity and banality, but also a form of invisible censorship. When, for example, television producers "pre-interview" participants in news and public affairs programs, to ensure that they will speak in simple, attention-grabbing terms, and when the search for viewers leads to an emphasis on the sensational and the spectacular, people with complex or nuanced views are not allowed a hearing.

Bourdieu is also remembered in the discipline for his theory of the habitus. In his written work Outline of a Theory of Practice (Bourdieu 1977), Bourdieu claims an audiences’ preference in media is shaped by their social context. How an individual interprets and engages with their surroundings, or their habitus, is the lasting and transferable elements of character which structure their consumer preferences. Bourdieu explains that though durable, the habitus is not set in stone, it instead acts as a “strategy-generating principle” allowing individuals to navigate new and unfamiliar situations.

Bourdieu expanded on the theory of the habitus, introducing his famous term, cultural capital. According to the French sociologist, cultural capital signifies an individual’s socially or culturally valuable skills and knowledge. He claims these competencies are developed through one’s upbringing, and access to education resources, as well as unconsciously shaped by their social environment. Bourdieu highlights this accumulation of competencies as a determining factor in one’s life chances. One’s cultural capital, such as a university degree, can lead them to be offered more opportunities, thus linking the concept to both economic and social capital. Bourdieu explains that it is through the content of the different capitals that the habitus will structure an individual's consumer taste. 

Numerous French post-secondary institutions offer courses in communications and media studies, at both the undergraduate and graduate level. Media and communications programs at ESCP Business School, Paris Institute of Political Studies, and Grenoble Alpes University, center around the study of journalism and other multimedia content, teaching media creation and management strategies.

Germany 

In Germany two main branches of media theory or media studies can be identified.

The first major branch of media theory has its roots in the humanities and cultural studies, such as film studies ("Filmwissenschaft"), theater studies ("Theaterwissenschaft") and German language and literature studies ("Germanistik") as well as Comparative Literature Studies ("Komparatistik"). This branch has broadened out substantially since the 1990s. And it is on this initial basis that a culturally-based media studies (often emphasised more recently through the disciplinary title Medienkulturwissenschaft) in Germany has primarily developed and established itself.

This plurality of perspectives make it difficult to single out one particular site where this branch of Medienwissenschaft originated. While the Frankfurt-based theatre scholar, Hans-Theis Lehmanns term "post dramatic theater" points directly to the increased blending of co-presence and mediatized material in the German theater (and elsewhere) since the 1970s, the field of theater studies from the 1990s onwards at the Freie Universität Berlin, led in particular by Erika Fischer-Lichte, showed particular interest in the ways in which theatricality influenced notions of performativity in aesthetic events. Within the field of Film Studies, again, both Frankfurt and Berlin were dominant in the development of new perspectives on moving image media. Heide Schlüpman in Frankfurt and Gertrud Koch, first in Bochum then in Berlin, were key theorists contributing to an aesthetic theory of the cinema (Schlüpmann) as dispositif and the moving image as medium, particularly in the context of illusion (Koch). Many scholars who became known as media scholars in Germany originally were scholars of German, such as Friedrich Kittler, who taught at the Humboldt Universität zu Berlin, completed both his dissertation and habilitation in the context of Germanistik. One of the early publications in this new direction is a volume edited by Helmut Kreuzer, Literature Studies - Media Studies (Literaturwissenschaft – Medienwissenschaft), which summarizes the presentations given at the Düsseldorfer Germanistentag 1976.

The second branch of media studies in Germany is comparable to Communication Studies. Pioneered by Elisabeth Noelle-Neumann in the 1940s, this branch studies mass media, its institutions and its effects on society and individuals. The German Institute for Media and Communication Policy, founded in 2005 by media scholar Lutz Hachmeister, is one of the few independent research institutions that is dedicated to issues surrounding media and communications policies.

The term Wissenschaft cannot be translated straightforwardly as studies, as it calls to mind both scientific methods and the humanities. Accordingly, German media theory combines philosophy, psychoanalysis, history, and scientific studies with media-specific research.

Medienwissenschaften is currently one of the most popular courses of study at universities in Germany, with many applicants mistakenly assuming that studying it will automatically lead to a career in TV or other media. This has led to widespread disillusionment, with students blaming the universities for offering highly theoretical course content. The universities maintain that practical journalistic training is not the aim of the academic studies they offer.

India 

Media Studies is a fast growing academic field in India, with several dedicated departments and research institutes. With a view to making the best use of communication facilities for information, publicity and development, the Government of India in 1962-63 sought the advice of the Ford Foundation/UNESCO team of internationally known mass communication specialists who recommended the setting up of a national institute for training, teaching and research in mass communication. Anna University was the first university to start Master of Science in Electronic Media programmes. It offers a five-year integrated programme and a two-year programme in Electronic Media. The Department of Media Sciences was started in January 2002, branching off from the UGC's Educational Multimedia Research Centre (EMMRC). National Institute of Open Schooling, the world's largest open schooling system, offers Mass Communication as a subject of studies at senior secondary level. All the major universities in the country have mass media and journalism studies departments. Centre for the Study of Developing Societies (CSDS), Delhi has media studies as one of their major emphasis.

Netherlands 

In the Netherlands, media studies are split into several academic courses such as (applied) communication sciences, communication- and information sciences, communication and media, media and culture or theater, film and television sciences. Whereas communication sciences focuses on the way people communicate, be it mediated or unmediated, media studies tends to narrow the communication down to just mediated communication. However, it would be a mistake to consider media studies a specialism of communication sciences, since media make up just a small portion of the overall course. Indeed, both studies tend to borrow elements from one another.

Communication sciences (or a derivative thereof) can be studied at Erasmus University Rotterdam, Radboud University, Tilburg University, University of Amsterdam, University of Groningen, University of Twente, Roosevelt Academy, University of Utrecht, VU University Amsterdam and Wageningen University and Research Centre.

Media studies (or something similar) can be studied at the University of Amsterdam, VU University Amsterdam, Erasmus University Rotterdam, University of Groningen,University of Maastricht and the University of Utrecht.

Nine Dutch universities collaborate in the overarching Netherlands Research school for Media Studies (RMeS), which acts as a platform for graduate students to build connections within the media studies discipline and to represent Dutch media scholars on an international level.

New Zealand 

Media studies in New Zealand is healthy, especially due to renewed activity in the country's film industry and is taught at both secondary and tertiary education institutes.  Media studies in NZ can be regarded as a singular success, with the subject well-established in the tertiary sector (such as Screen and Media Studies at the University of Waikato; Media Studies, Victoria University of Wellington; Film, Television and Media Studies, University of Auckland; Media Studies, Massey University; Communication Studies, University of Otago).

Different courses can offer students a range of specialisations- such as cultural studies, media theory and analysis, practical film-making, journalism and communications studies. But what makes the case of New Zealand particularly significant in respect of Media Studies is that for more than a decade it has been a nationally mandated and very popular subject in secondary (high) schools, taught across three years in a very structured and developmental fashion, with Scholarship in Media Studies available for academically gifted students. According to the New Zealand Ministry of Education Subject Enrolment figures 229 New Zealand schools offered Media Studies as a subject in 2016, representing more than 14,000 students.

Pakistan 

In Pakistan, media studies programs are widely offered.International Islamaic University,Islamabad. University of the Punjab. Lahore is the oldest department. Later on University of Karachi, Federal Urdu university of Art's science and technology, established department of mass communication in 2002 and many students past out this university, nowadays working in different News channels and media house, Peshawar University, BZU Multaan, Islamia University Bahwalpur also started communication programs. Now, newly established universities are also offering mass communication program in which University of Gujrat emerged as a leading department. Bahria University which is established by Pakistan Navy is also offering BS in media studies.

Switzerland 

In Switzerland, media and communication studies are offered by several higher education institutions including the International Institute in Geneva, Zurich University of Applied Sciences, University of Lugano, University of Fribourg and others. The Swiss programs study current trends and strategies used by media corporations, while examining their influence and consequences on modern day society.

United Kingdom 

In the United Kingdom, media studies developed in the 1960s from the academic study of English, and from literary criticism more broadly. The key date, according to Andrew Crisell, is 1959:

When Joseph Trenaman left the BBC's Further Education Unit to become the first holder of the Granada Research Fellowship in Television at Leeds University. Soon after in 1966, the Centre for Mass Communication Research was founded at Leicester University, and degree programmes in media studies began to sprout at polytechnics and other universities during the 1970s and 1980s.

James Halloran at the University of Leicester is credited with much influence in the development of media studies and communication studies, as the head of the university's Centre for Mass Communication Research, and founder of the International Association for Media and Communication Research. Media Studies is now taught all over the UK. It is taught at Key Stages 1– 3, Entry Level, GCSE and at A level and the Scottish Qualifications Authority offers formal qualifications at a number of different levels. It is offered through a large area of exam boards including AQA and WJEC.

Much research in the field of news media studies has been led by the Reuters Institute for the Study of Journalism. Details of the research projects and results are published in the RISJ annual report.

United States 

Mass communication, communication studies or simply 'Communication' are names that are used far more frequently than “media studies” for academic departments in the United States. However, the focus of such programs sometimes excludes certain media—film, book publishing, video games, etc. The title “media studies” may be used alone, to designate film studies and rhetorical or critical theory, or it may appear in combinations like “media studies and communication” to join two fields or emphasize a different focus. It involves the study of many emerging, contemporary media and platforms, with social media having boomed in recent years. Broadcast and cable TV is no longer the primary form of entertainment, with various screens offering worldwide events and pastimes around the clock. Proceeding are some examples of the evolution of some institutions that reside within the United States who have taken media studies under their wing and grown with it.

In 1999, the MIT Comparative Media Studies program started under the leadership of Henry Jenkins, since growing into a graduate program, MIT's largest humanities major, and, following a 2012 merger with the Writing and Humanistic Studies program, a roster of twenty faculty, including Pulitzer Prize-winning author Junot Diaz, science fiction writer Joe Haldeman, games scholar T. L. Taylor, and media scholars William Uricchio (a CMS co-founder), Edward Schiappa, and Heather Hendershot. Now named Comparative Media Studies/Writing, the department places an emphasis on what Jenkins and colleagues had termed "applied humanities": it hosts several research groups for civic media, digital humanities, games, computational media, documentary, and mobile design, and these groups are used to provide graduate students with research assistantships to cover the cost of tuition and living expenses. The incorporation of Writing and Humanistic Studies also placed MIT's Science Writing program, Writing Across the Curriculum, and Writing and Communications Center under the same roof.

Around the same time as MIT an interdisciplinary major at the University of Virginia, the Department of Media Studies was officially established in 2000 and has rapidly grown and doubled in size in 2011. This is partly thanks to the acquisition of Professor Siva Vaidhyanathan, a cultural historian and media scholar, as well as the Inaugural Verklin Media Policy and Ethics Conference, endowed by the CEO of Canoe Ventures and UVA alumnus David Verklin.

University of California, Irvine had professor Mark Poster who was one of the first and foremost theorists of media culture in the US who boasted a strong Department of Film & Media Studies. University of California, Berkeley has three institutional structures within media studies that take place in the department of Film and Media (formerly Film Studies Program), including famous theorists as Mary Ann Doane and Linda Williams, the Center for New Media, and a long established interdisciplinary program formerly titled Mass Communications, which recently changed its name to Media Studies. This change eliminated any connotations that may accompany the term “Mass” in the former title. Until recently, Radford University in Virginia used the title "media studies" for a department that taught practitioner-oriented major concentrations in journalism, advertising, broadcast production and Web design. In 2008, those programs were combined with a previous department of communication (speech and public relations) to create a School of Communication. (A media studies major at Radford still means someone concentrating on journalism, broadcasting, advertising or Web production.)

Brooklyn College has collaborated with City University of New York to offer graduate studies in television and media since 2015. Currently, the Department of Television and Radio administers an MS in Media Studies, and hosts the Center for the Study of World Television.

See also
Anthropology of media
Fan studies
Innis's time- and space-bias
Journalism
Market for loyalties theory
Mass media
Mass communication
McLuhan's tetrad of media effects
Media culture
Media echo chamber
Media ecology
Media literacy
Media psychology
Media-system dependency
Mediatization (media)
Narcotizing dysfunction
Social aspects of television
Sociology
The Structural Transformation of the Public Sphere
Transparency (humanities)
Uses and gratifications theory

References

External links 

 ‘Media Studies: Text, Production and Context' - How to do Media Studies by Paul Long and Tim Wall from Birmingham City University.
The Media Literacy of Primary School Children - How far do Primary School children have the knowledge and skills to access media, make sense of the representations and images produced and to create their own? by Grant Strudley, University of Reading'

 
Humanities